Hervé Loste (29 May 1926 - 10 February 1994) was a French politician who represented Wallis and Futuna in the French National Assembly from 1962 to 1967.

He became director of the Ballande Establishments in Nouméa and Wallis and Futuna . He became involved in politics and became the first deputy of the new overseas territory of Wallis and Futuna during the 1962 French legislative election, under the label of the National Centre of Independents and Peasants, defeating Emmanuel-Victor Brial, son of Julien Brial. He supported his father Henry Loste who became senator for the territory a few months later. In November 1962, a new election took place and he was re-elected deputy under the label of the Independent Republicans. Loste was beaten by Benjamin Brial at the end of his mandate, in 1967.

References 

1926 births
1994 deaths
20th-century French politicians
Wallis and Futuna politicians
Deputies of the 2nd National Assembly of the French Fifth Republic
Members of Parliament for Wallis and Futuna